Kinsau is a municipality in the district of Landsberg in Bavaria in Germany.

References

Landsberg (district)